is a velodrome located in Yahiko, Niigata that conducts pari-mutuel Keirin racing - one of Japan's four authorized  where gambling is permitted. Its Keirin identification number for betting purposes is 21# (21 sharp).

Yahiko's oval is 400 meters in circumference. A typical keirin race of 2,025 meters consists of five laps around the course.

Because of its location in Niigata Prefecture near the Sea of Japan, races at Yahiko Velodrome are held during warm weather months, from April to November.

External links
Yahiko Keirin Home Page (Japanese)
keirin.jp Yahiko Information (Japanese)

Yahiko, Niigata
Velodromes in Japan
Sports venues completed in 1950
Cycle racing in Japan
Sports venues in Niigata Prefecture
1950 establishments in Japan